Henry Addison Fletcher (December 11, 1839 – April 19, 1897) was an American Civil War veteran, a farmer and a U.S. politician of the Republican Party.  He is most notable for his service as the 38th lieutenant governor of Vermont from 1890 to 1892.

Early life
Fletcher was born in Cavendish, Vermont on December 11, 1839, the son of Ryland Fletcher and Mary (May) Fletcher.  Fletcher was the son and grandson of prominent Vermont politicians; his father was both the Lieutenant Governor (1854–1856) and the Governor (1856–1858) of Vermont.  His grandfather, Asaph Fletcher, was a member of the convention which applied to Congress for the admission of Vermont into the Union, and served for several sessions in the Vermont Legislature, was a county judge and presidential elector.

Henry Fletcher grew up on his family's farm in Cavendish, and was educated in the local schools before attending Chester and Black River Academies.  After completing his education, Fletcher became a farmer in Cavendish.

Civil War 
On August 29, 1862, Fletcher enlisted in the Union Army for the American Civil War, and was mustered in as second sergeant of Company C, 16th Vermont Infantry, a unit of the 2nd Vermont Brigade.  He was promoted to first sergeant on October 23, 1862, and regimental sergeant major on March 9, 1863.  Fletcher was commissioned as a second lieutenant in Company C on April 23, 1863, to date from April 2.  He took part in all the 16th Vermont's engagements, including the Battle of Gettysburg, and mustered out when the regiment's enlistments expired on August 10, 1863.  After the war, Fletcher was a member of the Grand Army of the Republic, the Reunion Society of Vermont Officers, and other veterans organizations.

Postwar life 
After the war, Fletcher owned and operated the farm that had started by his grandfather.  A Republican, he represented his hometown in the Vermont House of Representatives in 1867, 1868, 1878, 1880 and 1882, and represented Windsor County in the Vermont Senate in 1886.  During his legislative career, his committee assignments included banking, railroads, revision of laws, and general affairs.

When Redfield Proctor served as governor from 1878 to 1880, Fletcher served on his military staff as aide-de-camp with the rank of colonel.

In 1890, Fletcher was elected lieutenant governor, and he served from 1890 to 1892, the one term available under the Republican Party's "Mountain Rule".  In 1892, Fletcher was a candidate for governor, but lost the Republican nomination to Levi K. Fuller at that year's state party convention.  After leaving office, Fletcher continued to operate his farm in Cavendish.

Family
Fletcher never married, and had no children.

Death and burial
Fletched died of Bright's disease in Cavendish on April 19, 1897.  He was buried at Cavendish Village Cemetery.

See also 
 Vermont in the Civil War

References

Sources

Newspapers

Books

External links

1839 births
1897 deaths
Members of the Vermont House of Representatives
Vermont state senators
Lieutenant Governors of Vermont
People of Vermont in the American Civil War
2nd Vermont Brigade
People from Windsor County, Vermont
Burials in Vermont
19th-century American politicians